Canton Electronics is a German loudspeaker manufacturer, known for producing high-end loudspeakers.

History 
Canton was founded in October 1972 by Hubert Milbers (Management), Otfried Sandig (Marketing, Sales), Wolfgang Seikritt (Development) and Günther Seitz (Technology). The company released their first bookshelf speakers that year. The company headquarters are located in Weilrod, Germany.

References

External links 
 
 

Loudspeaker manufacturers
German brands
Luxury brands
Audio equipment manufacturers of Germany